The 2009 Internationaux du Doubs – Open de Franche-Comté was a professional tennis tournament played on outdoor hard courts. It was part of the 2009 ATP Challenger Tour. It took place in Besançon, France between 23 February and 1 March 2009.

Singles main-draw entrants

Seeds

 Rankings are as of February 16, 2009.

Other entrants
The following players received wildcards into the singles main draw:
  Grigor Dimitrov
  Nicolas Guillaume
  Julien Jeanpierre
  Benoît Paire

The following players received entry from the qualifying draw:
  Illya Marchenko
  Philipp Oswald
  Michał Przysiężny
  Nicolas Renavand
  Jean-Christophe Faurel (as a Lucky loser)

Champions

Men's singles

 Kristof Vliegen def.  Andreas Beck, 6–2, 6–7(6), 6–3

Men's doubles

 Karol Beck /  Jaroslav Levinský def.  David Škoch /  Igor Zelenay, 2–6, 7–5, 10–7

External links
 

Internationaux du Doubs - Open de Franche-Comte
2009 in French tennis